Wattsia is a genus of emperor native to the Indian Ocean and the western Pacific Ocean. It is monotypic, with only a single species, the Mozambique large-eye bream (Wattsia mossambica). This species grows to a length of  TL though most do not exceed . It is of minor importance to local commercial fisheries.

References

Lethrinidae
Monotypic fish genera
Fish described in 1957